Enrique Caballero is a paralympic athlete from Cuba competing mainly in category F12 jumping events.

Enrique was part of the Cuban team that travelled to the 1996 Summer Paralympics in Atlanta.  There he was successful in winning gold in both the F12 long and triple jumps and silver behind Italian Aldo Manganaro in the T12 100m.

References

Paralympic athletes of Cuba
Athletes (track and field) at the 1996 Summer Paralympics
Paralympic gold medalists for Cuba
Paralympic silver medalists for Cuba
Cuban male sprinters
Cuban male long jumpers
Cuban male triple jumpers
Living people
Medalists at the 1996 Summer Paralympics
Year of birth missing (living people)
Paralympic medalists in athletics (track and field)
Visually impaired sprinters
Visually impaired long jumpers
Visually impaired triple jumpers
Paralympic sprinters
Paralympic long jumpers
Paralympic triple jumpers
20th-century Cuban people